is a Japanese professional baseball infielder for the Saitama Seibu Lions in Japan's Nippon Professional Baseball.

External links

NPB.com

1990 births
Living people
Baseball people from Kyoto Prefecture
Ritsumeikan University alumni
Japanese baseball players
Nippon Professional Baseball infielders
Nippon Professional Baseball outfielders
Saitama Seibu Lions players